RAF Dry Tree was a Royal Air Force early warning radar station for detecting enemy aircraft during the Second World War. It was built in 1940 on Goonhilly Downs, on the Lizard peninsula in Cornwall, a short distance to the south-east of the Goonhilly Earth Station. It was named from the standing stone on the land known as the Dry Tree menhir.

Purpose
Its purpose was detecting aircraft approaching South Cornwall and the Western Approaches. It had four  transmitter masts and two  wooden receiver masts. Its existence was only revealed after the war had ended. Most of the station was destroyed in the early 1960s to make way for the satellite communication station. Some buildings and structures still exist and are located within a nature reserve. The nerve centre was the receiver block which now has public access to the roof, giving excellent views across the Downs. Other buildings and structures which were part of RAF Dry Tree can also be seen.

Dry Tree menhir

The Dry Tree menhir is a ten foot standing stone located on the ex-RAF Dry Tree site at Goonhilly, which the station takes its name from. The menhir was seemingly named Dry Tree due its resemblance to a dry tree trunk.

See also

 List of former Royal Air Force stations

References

Military units and formations established in 1940
Royal Air Force stations in Cornwall
Military history of Cornwall